La vendedora de rosas (The rose seller) is a 1998 Colombian film directed by Víctor Gaviria. The film is loosely based on the 1845 fairy tale "The Little Match Girl" by Hans Christian Andersen; it was entered into the 1998 Cannes Film Festival. The film was selected as the Colombian entry for the Best Foreign Language Film at the 71st Academy Awards, but was not accepted as a nominee.The film is notable for hiring not actors, but talented young children who lived on the streets of Medellin, Colombia, to portray the characters. It follows a young girl named Andrea (Mileider Gil), who after a fight with her mother, flees to stay with her best friend Monica (Leidy Tabares), an orphaned rose seller. While Andrea works alongside Monica, she realizes street life is not as easy as she believed. Monica must evade capture from the local gang, ruled by Don Hector (Elkin Rodriguez).

Many of the actors that starred in the film are now dead or in prison. Giovanni Quiroz was murdered in Medellín and Leidy Tabares was incarcerated for her involvement in the murder of a taxi driver in Medellín. Elkin Giovanny Rodriguez (Don Hector in the film) and Alex Bedoya (Milton) are dead now. Some of them are still alive but living in tough conditions, such as Mileider Gil, who just play a small roll on “Rosario Tijeras” .

Plot 

The film is set at Christmas time, in the poor and dangerous neighborhood known as Barrio Triste, in Medellín, at the end of the 90s. The film begins with Andrea, an impoverished girl who lives in the Miramar neighborhood. She flees her home after a beating from her mother and goes to look for Mónica, who is a rose seller and who had also fled her family after the death of her grandmother. Mónica lives with and leads a group of her friends, who are immersed in a difficult life of drug use and prostitution. The group is composed of Diana, known as Cachetona, Judy, who prostitutes herself, and Claudia, who also sells roses. They live in a hostel for low-income individuals. The city is celebrating the Novena of aguinaldos.

A street gang, led by Don Héctor, and including such characters as Zarco and El Enano (The Dwarf), discuss their next hits. After spotting a drug addict, Zarco and El Enano attack and rob him. Not long after Zarco returns with a gun and shoots him, an act that Don Héctor does not like.

In the city, Andrea starts selling roses like her friends while Judy prostitutes herself to buy clothes. While selling roses, a drunk man gives Mónica a watch, she thinks it is a gift from heaven from her mother and plans to give it to her boyfriend Anderson, a young drug dealer for their fifteen day anniversary. However, she breaks up with him when she finds out that he was flirting with Marcela, a friend of Claudia's.

Andrea wanders the streets and is caught by surprise by a homeless man who tries to molest her. Choco and Zorro chases him away, but in the process they kill a homeless man who was dozing in a park after mistaking him for the one who tried to abuse Andrea.

Mónica and Andrea return to Miramar; Andrea returns home but leaves again after stealing her sister's roller skates and picking up her clothes. Meanwhile, Don Héctor's gang is arguing about Zarco's reckless actions that put the gang at risk; Mónica meets her cousin, El Enano, who asks her to show him the watch she had been given the night before. At that moment she is deceived by Zarco, who exchanges the watch for another of lower quality.

Mónica returns to her old home where she plans to spend Christmas Eve, but after her aunt's husband tries taking advantage of her while she is napping she decides to leave again. Back in Barrio Triste, Mónica contacts Chinga, a homeless boy, to steal some jewelry to get money for fireworks and clothing. Andrea and Judy sell the roller skates that Andrea stole from her sister but Judy swindles her, keeping about half of the sales price. Andrea finds out and becomes depressed, but after Mónica confronts Judy the three reconcile.

Meanwhile, the police are tracking Don Héctor's gang. Knowing that they are looking for Zarco, they decide to find him first and tell him to hide, which he refuses to do. Don Héctor threatens him and leaves. Shortly thereafter, Mónica runs into Zarco, who chases her down and orders her to give him back the watch he gave her (which Mónica has already exchanged for some fireworks), since the one he took had gotten wet and been damaged. He then beats her and threatens to kill her later if she doesn't return it to him.

Later on, Diana's father comes to the hostel searching for her and convinces her to return home with him. She says goodbye to her friends and leaves with her father.

One night, Judy gets into the car of a sicario, who tries to take advantage of her. She stabs him and runs away, but not before he manages to injure her as well.

Elsewhere, Anderson, Milton, Choco, and Zorro enjoy a party with Andrea. Anderson tries to seduce Andrea while Choco's gang tries to steal a briefcase. They don't succeed, instead being shot at, with Milton ending up wounded in the encounter.

Mónica ends up returning to Miramar with Judy and Andrea. When Andrea returns home, her mom tells her that she loves her and will treat her better.

Meanwhile, Zarco and El Enano rob a taxi driver who Zarco ends up stabbing, leaving him seriously injured. El Enano gets angry with Zarco, who responds by attacking him and cutting his hand. Wounded,  he goes to Don Héctor and tells him what happened. Don Héctor decides El Zarco is getting out of hand, and they go out looking for him. Mónica manages to get to the back of the house she grew up in, which is now in ruins, and starts hallucinating about her mother while under the influence of Boxer brand industrial glue. Zarco finds her and stabs her to death. Zarco is mortally wounded by Don Héctor's gang, and meets his end dead in a gutter.

Cast
 Leidy Tabares — Mónica
 Marta Correa — Judy
 Mileider Gil — Andrea
 Diana Murillo — Cachetona
 Liliana Giraldo — Claudia
 Álex Bedoya — Milton
 Giovanni Quiroz — El Zarco

Accolades
The movie won the Premio del Público award at the 39th Cartagena Film Festival, among other national prizes.

See also
 Lady, la vendedora de rosas
 List of submissions to the 71st Academy Awards for Best Foreign Language Film
 List of Colombian submissions for the Academy Award for Best Foreign Language Film

References

External links

1998 films
Colombian drama films
1990s Spanish-language films
Films based on The Little Match Girl
Films directed by Víctor Gaviria
Colombian independent films
1998 drama films
1998 independent films